Pradeep Giri (6 November 1945 – 20 August 2022) was a Nepali politician from Siraha district Madhesh origin and a member of the House of Representatives from the Nepali Congress. He was also part of the party's central committee.

Personal life 
Giri was born in Bastipur, Siraha. He came from a political family. Giri's uncle Tulsi Giri was Nepali Congress leader who later joined Panchayat system and became prime minister of Nepal.

Political career 
Pradip Giri was as famous at the national level as he was at the local level. During the Madhes movement, his role was in favor of the agitators. Giri was known as a socialist thinker and intellectual leader in the country and abroad along with Congress politics. Giri was elected as a member of the House of Representatives from Siraha Constituency No. 5 in the 2017 general election.

He became a proportional member from the Congress in the first and second Constituent Assembly elections.

He didn't sign the Constitution of Nepal 2072 citing it was incomplete and did not fulfil the demand of all citizens. Giri said, "It is true that I did not sign the constitution passed ignoring the demands of the Madhesi people. I have boycotted the parliament by raising the demand of Madhesis, the Madhesi people have understood this." He was serving as the member of the 1st Federal Parliament of Nepal. In the 2017 Nepalese general election, he was elected from the Siraha 1 constituency, securing 23,951(39.82%)  votes.

He was influenced by the works of B. R. Ambedkar, the constitution maker of India.

Electoral history

2017 legislative elections

Death 
He died on 20 August 2022, at the age of 76, Nepal Mediciti Hospital in Lalitpur at around 9:30 pm on Saturday. He was suffering from cancer, and pneumonia coupled with it had led to multi-organ failure at the last stage. He always believed in ethical politics.

See also 
 Tulsi Giri

References 

Nepal MPs 2017–2022
1945 births
2022 deaths
People from Siraha District
Nepali Congress politicians from Madhesh Province
Members of the 1st Nepalese Constituent Assembly
Members of the 2nd Nepalese Constituent Assembly